Ebadat may refer to:
 Ebadat 1
 Ebadat 2